Naftali Wahba Bezem (November 27, 1924 - October 2, 2018) was an Israeli painter, muralist and sculptor.

Biography

Naftali Bezem was born in Essen, Germany, in 1924.  His early adolescence was spent under Nazi oppression, in constant fear for the safety of his parents, who perished in Auschwitz concentration camp.  Naftali immigrated to Mandate Palestine in 1939, at the age of fourteen with a Youth Aliyah group. From 1943 to 1946, he studied art at the Bezalel Academy of Art and Design in Jerusalem with Israeli painter Mordecai Ardon.  He then spent three years studying in Paris. Bezem's son Yitzhak was killed in the 1975 Zion Square refrigerator bombing in downtown Jerusalem.

Art career
In addition to painting and sculpture, Bezem created murals, wall reliefs, tapestries, and stained glass windows. His most famous public works include a wall relief at Yad Vashem in Jerusalem and the ceiling mural in the main reception room at the President's Residence, Jerusalem.

Awards and recognition
 In 1957, Bezem was a co-recipient of the Dizengoff Prize for Painting.

See also
Israeli art

References

Further reading
 Naftali Bezem, Jerusalem, Debel Gallery, Ein Kerem, 1980
 Ted W. Gross, Ben-Dov and I. Mintzer, The Passover Haggadah Illustrated by Naftali Bezem, Tel Aviv, 1982.
 Matthias Kohn, Naftali Bezem, Bern, Benteli Verlag, 1998 (Editions in German and in English).
 Open Museum, Naftali Bezem - Rope Ladder 1996-1999, Open Museum, 2000.

External links 

Jewish Israeli artists
Jewish sculptors
Jewish emigrants from Nazi Germany to Mandatory Palestine
Israeli sculptors
Modern sculptors
Bezalel Academy of Arts and Design alumni
1924 births
2018 deaths